The Ligny is a stream in Belgium, a tributary of the Orneau on the right bank. Its waters eventually join the Meuse via the Sambre.

References

Rivers of Belgium